Mingus Lives is a live album by American jazz pianist Mal Waldron recorded in Belgium in 1979 and released by the Enja label.

Reception
The Allmusic review awarded the album 3 stars.

Track listing
All compositions by Mal Waldron
 "Mingus Lives" — 7:48 
 "Snake Out" — 10:42 
 "Tensile Structure" — 7:54 
 "Here, There and Anywhere" — 10:44  
Recorded at the Chapati Club in Spa, Belgium on February 28, 1979

Personnel
 Mal Waldron – piano

References

Enja Records albums
Mal Waldron albums
1979 live albums
Solo piano jazz albums